Dorodoca anthophoba is a moth in the family Cosmopterigidae. It is found in the Democratic Republic of Congo.

The larvae feed on the flowers of Piptadenia africana and Entada abyssinica.

References

Natural History Museum Lepidoptera generic names catalog

Cosmopteriginae